Rubene Parish is an administrative territorial entity of Jēkabpils Municipality, Latvia. It was an administrative unit of the Jēkabpils District. The administrative center is Rubeņi.

Towns, villages and settlements of Rubene Parish 
 Kaldabruņa
 Rubeņi
 Slate

Gallery

External links

Parishes of Latvia
Jēkabpils Municipality